Ivanovo Severny (also Ivanovo North or Zhukovka) is an air base in Russia located 6 km north of Ivanovo.  It is a large transport operation airfield with hangars and significant tarmac space.  The runway was built in 1935 and upgraded in 1965.  The airfield received the Soviet Union's first Ilyushin Il-76 delivery on June 3, 1974.

The base is home to the 144th Airborne Early Warning Aviation Regiment of the 12th Military Transport Aviation Division and the 4th Centre for Combat Application and Crew Training.

US intelligence summaries from 1957 showed 25 Tupolev Tu-4 Bull bomber aircraft and 17 Lisunov Li-2 Cab aircraft operated at Ivanovo Severny.

Ivanovo Severny was home to 81 VTAP (81st Military Transport Aviation Regiment) flying Il-76, An-12, and An-22 aircraft.  It was decommissioned in 1998.  It is also home to 2457 Air Base of SDRLO flying the Beriev A-50.

The base is home to the 610th Center for Combat Use and Retraining of Military Transport Aviation Flight Personnel (610th CBP i PLS) which uses the A-50 and A-50U AWACS.

References

Soviet Air Force bases
Soviet Military Transport Aviation
Russian Air Force bases
Airports in Ivanovo Oblast